The first season of the anime series Inuyasha aired in Japan on ytv from October 16, 2000, through May 21, 2001. Based on the manga series of the same title by Rumiko Takahashi, the episodes were produced by Sunrise and directed by Masashi Ikeda. The series follows a half demon Inuyasha's and a high school girl Kagome Higurashi's journey, alongside their friends Shippo, Miroku and Sango to obtain the fragments of the shattered Jewel of Four Souls, a powerful jewel that had been hidden inside Kagome's body, and keep the shards from being used for evil.

The anime is licensed for release in North America by Viz Media. The English dub of the first season was broadcast on Cartoon Network as part of its Adult Swim programming block from August 31, 2002, through January 21, 2003, and ran again on its Toonami block beginning on November 3, 2012. The first season was released across nine DVD compilations by Viz Media. A full box set containing all twenty-seven episodes was released on September 7, 2004.

Three pieces of theme music are used for the episodes; one opening theme and two closing themes. The Japanese opening theme is "Change the World" by V6, used for all twenty-seven episodes. Two closing themes are "My Will" by Japanese girl group Dream and Do As Infinity's , used for twenty and remaining seven episodes respectively.



Episode list

Notes

References

2000 Japanese television seasons
2001 Japanese television seasons
Season 1